Paul Reubens (born 1952) is an American comedian.

Reubens may also refer to:
Reubens, Idaho
Reuben's Restaurant

People with the surname
Sir Peter Paul Reubens (1577–1640), Flemish Baroque painter

See also
Reuben
David and Simon Reuben
Ruben
Rubens (disambiguation)
Rubin